The Hesburgh Award is an award, established in 1993, given by TIAA-CREF to a university that has exceptional faculty development programs. It is named for Theodore M. Hesburgh, former president of the University of Notre Dame and former member of the TIAA and CREF Boards of Overseers.

List of Award Winners
1999 Georgia Institute of Technology
2000 Ferris State University
2001 Utah Valley State College
2002 Babson College
2003 Indiana University Bloomington
2004 Barnard College
2005 Wagner College
2006 University of Colorado at Boulder
2007 University of Wyoming
2008 Baruch College
2010 University System of Maryland
2011 University of Maryland, Baltimore County
2012 California State University System and Miami Dade College
2013 University of Texas at El Paso

References

External links
Official website

American education awards